The 1981–82 FA Cup was the 101st season of the world's oldest football knockout competition, The Football Association Challenge Cup, or FA Cup for short.

The competition culminated with the FA Cup Final, held at Wembley Stadium, London on 22 May 1982. The match was contested by two London clubs, Tottenham Hotspur and Queens Park Rangers, with Tottenham retaining the trophy with a 1–0 victory in a replay after a 1–1 draw in the first game.

For information on the matches played from the preliminary round to the fourth round qualifying, see the FA website.

First round proper

Teams from the Football League Third and Fourth Division entered in this round plus Altrincham, Bishop's Stortford, Sutton United and Enfield were given byes. The first round of games were played over the weekend 20–21 November 1981. Replays were played mainly on 23–25 November.

Second round proper

The Second Round was intended to be played on 12 December 1981, although many were not played until 15 December or even 2 January or 9 January. Replays were played on various dates after these games.

Third round proper

Teams from the Football League First and Second Division entered in this round. The Third Round was intended to be played on 2 January 1982. However, some matched were played initially over the period 4–6 January, while others took place as late as 23 January. Most replays took place over 18–21 January.

Fourth round proper

The Fourth Round was mainly played on 23 January 1982. Matches were played or replayed either on 26 January, or on 1 February.

Fifth round proper

The Fifth Round matches were all played on 13 February 1982. The only replay was played on 16 February.

Sixth round proper

The sixth-round games were played on 6 March 1982. There were no replays.

Semi-finals

The matches were both played on 3 April 1982. Tottenham and Queens Park Rangers were victorious and reached the FA Cup Final.

Referee:- Neil Midgley (Salford)

Referee:- Keith Hackett (Sheffield)

Final

The final was held at Wembley Stadium on 22 May 1982. The replay was held on 27 May 1982.

Replay

TV Coverage
The right to show FA Cup games were, as with Football League matches, shared between the BBC and ITV network. All games were shown in a highlights format, except the Final, which was shown live both on BBC1 & ITV. The BBC football highlights programme Match of the Day would show up to three games and the various ITV regional network stations would cover up to one game and show highlights from other games covered elsewhere on the ITV network. No games from the first or second round were covered. Highlights of replays would be shown on either the BBC or ITV.

This Season BBC Match Of The Day Highlights were back on Saturday nights while the ITV regional Highlights programmes were back on Sunday afternoons in the third season of the 4 year alternation deal

Third Round BBC Leicester City v Southampton, Barnet v Brighton & Hove Albion, Swansea City v Liverpool ITV Tottenham Hotspur v Arsenal (LWT), Watford v Manchester United (Granada out of region, although used TVS cameras & commentator Gerald Sinstadt), Birmingham City v Ipswich Town (Central & Anglia), Rotherham United v Sunderland (Yorkshire & Tyne-Tees), Brighton & Hove Albion v Barnet (Midweek replay all regions), Notts County v Aston Villa (Midweek all regions)
 Fourth Round BBC Watford v West Ham United, Tottenham Hotspur v Leeds United, Manchester City v Coventry City (Midweek Replays not televised due to both being on the Tuesday Night) ITV Luton Town v Ipswich Town (Anglia & LWT), Gillingham v West Bromwich Albion (TVS & Central), Sunderland v Liverpool (Tyne-Tees & Yorkshire), Blackpool v Queens Park Rangers (Granada) 
Fifth Round BBC Tottenham Hotspur v Aston Villa, Leicester City v Watford, West Bromwich Albion v Norwich City ITV Chelsea v Liverpool (LWT), Shrewsbury Town v Ipswich Town (Anglia out of region, although used Granada's cameras & commentator Martin Tyler), Coventry City v Oxford United (Central, also showed the Shrewsbury game) (Midweek Replay all regions) Orient v Crystal Palace (All Regions)
Sixth Round BBC Chelsea v Tottenham Hotspur, Leicester City v Shrewsbury Town ITV QPR v Crystal Palace (LWT), West Bromwich Albion v Coventry City (Central) (All regions showed these games) 
Semifinals BBC Queens Park Rangers v West Bromwich Albion ITV'' Leicester City v Tottenham Hotspur (All regions showed this game)
Final Queens Park Rangers v Tottenham Hotspur (Both BBC & ITV showed the Final live. BBC & all ITV regions apart from Yorkshire showed the replay)

References

External links
The FA Cup at TheFA.com
FA Cup at BBC.co.uk
FA Cup news at Reuters.co.uk

 
FA Cup seasons
Fa Cup, 1981-82
1981–82 domestic association football cups